Alina is a female given name of European origin. It is particularly common in Northern, Central and Eastern Europe. It may be derived from the name Adelina. Alina was one of the top 10 most popular names in Switzerland and one of the top 50 most popular names in Finland, Norway, Germany and Austria in 2020.

Notable people

A–G
 Alina Baraz (born 1993), American singer
 Alina Bârgăoanu, Romanian university professor
 Alina Bercu (born 1990), Romanian concert pianist
 Alina Bucur,  Romanian-born mathematician and university professor
 Alina Cho, American television correspondent
 Alina Cojocaru (born 1981), Romanian ballet dancer
 Alina Devecerski (born 1983), Swedish singer
 Alina Dikhtiar (born 1988), Ukrainian skater
 Alina Alexandra Dumitru (born 1982), Romanian judoka
 Alina Eremia (born 1993), Romanian singer
 Alina Fernández (born 1956), daughter of Fidel Castro and Natalia Revuelta Clews
 Alina Forsman (1845-1899), Finnish sculptor
 Alina Frasa (1834-1899), Finnish ballerina
 Alina Garciamendez (born 1991), Mexican-American footballer
 Alina Goreac (born 1952), Romanian artistic gymnast
 Alina Gorghiu (born 1978), Romanian lawyer and politician
 Alina Grosu (born 1995), Ukrainian singer
 Alina Gut (born 1938), Polish politician

H–N
 Alina Harnasko (born 2001), Belarusian rhythmic gymnast
 Alina Iagupova (born 1992), Ukrainian basketball player
 Alina Ibragimova (born 1985), Russian-British violinist
 Alina Ilie (born 1996), Romanian handballer
 Alina Iordache (born 1982), Romanian handballer
 Alina Ivanova (born 1969), Russian race walker
 Alina Jägerstedt (1858-1919), Swedish social democratic and trade unionist
 Alina Jidkova (born 1977), Russian tennis player
 Alina Kabata-Pendias (1929-2019), Polish scientist
 Alina Kabayeva (born 1983), Russian rhythmic gymnast, mistress of Vladimir Putin
 Alina Kham (born 1959), Russian field hockey player
 Alina Kozich (born 1987), Ukrainian artistic gymnast
 Alina Maksimenko (born 1991), Russian rhythmic gymnast
 Alina Martain (late 11th century-1125), French nun and saint
 Alina Militaru (born 1982), Romanian long jumper
 Alina Mungiu-Pippidi (born 1964), political scientist, academic, journalist, and writer

O–Z
 Alina Orlova (born 1988), Lithuanian sung poetry singer and musician
 Alina Panova, American film producer and film and stage costume designer
 Alina Pienkowska (1952-2002), Polish free trade union activist and a Senator for Gdańsk
 Alina Plugaru (born 1987), Romanian entrepreneur and pornographic film actress
 Alina Pogostkina (born 1983), Russian-born German violinist
 Alina Popa (born 1978), Romanian bodybuilder
 Alina Puscau (born 1981), Romanian model, actress and singer
 Alina Reh (born 1997), German long-distance runner
 Alina Reyes (born 1956), French writer
 Alina Rosenberg (born 1992), German Paralympic equestrian
 Alina Vera Savin (born 1988), Romanian bobsledder
 Alina Shpak (born 1980), Ukrainian archivist
 Alina Shynkarenko (born 1998), Ukrainian synchro swimmer
 Alina Smith (born 1991), Russian-American pop singer-songwriter and record producer
 Alina Somova (born 1985), Russian ballet dancer
 Alina Stănculescu (born 1990), Romanian artistic gymnast
 Alina Stremous (born 1995), Moldovan biathlete
 Alina Surmacka Szczesniak (1925-2016), Polish-born American food scientist
 Alina Szapocznikow (1926-1973), Polish sculptor and holocaust survivor
 Alina Talay (born 1989), Belarusian track and field athlete
 Alina Tugend, American journalist, writer and public speaker
 Alina Tumilovich (born 1990), Belarusian rhythmic gymnast
 Alina Vedmid (1940–2008), Ukrainian agronomist and politician 
 Alina Zagitova (born 2002), Russian figure skater

Fictional characters 
 Alina Pop, character from the British soap opera Coronation Street
 Alina Starkov, main character from Leigh Bardugo's Shadow and Bone series (and its adaptation)
 Alina Gray, main villain from the role-playing video game Magia Record

Other uses
 Alina people, mentioned in the Rigveda

See also
 Aline (disambiguation)
 Alena (disambiguation)
 Aleena (disambiguation)

References

Greek feminine given names
Armenian feminine given names
Romanian feminine given names
Italian feminine given names
German feminine given names
Russian feminine given names